The Mârghia is a right tributary of the river Cotmeana in Romania. It flows into the Cotmeana near Ciești.

References

Rivers of Romania
Rivers of Argeș County
Rivers of Olt County